Prince Charles of Hesse and by Rhine (23 April 1809 - 20 March 1877) was a German prince, officer and politician. He was the second surviving son of Louis II, Grand Duke of Hesse and Wilhelmine of Baden. The prince had a military career and became a general in the infantry of the army of the Grand Duchy of Hesse. He was also a member of the Landtag of Hesse.

As his brother Grand Duke Louis III did not have children, he was succeeded by Prince Charles' eldest son,  Grand Duke Louis IV.

Early life

Prince Charles of Hesse was born on 23 April 1809 in the city of Darmstadt, capital of the newly created Grand Duchy of Hesse, established as the successor state of the Landgraviate of Hesse-Darmstadt in 1806. He was the second surviving son of Louis, Hereditary Prince of Hesse (later Grand Duke Louis II) and his spouse Wilhelmine of Baden, a daughter of Charles Louis, Hereditary Prince of Baden. He was educated together with his older brother Prince Louis (later Grand Duke Louis III), and also made extensive educational journeys through Europe with his brother.

As a younger son, he was expected to have a military career. Initially, he joined the Imperial Austrian Army. In 1830, Prince Charles' grandfather, Grand Duke Louis I, died, and Charles' father became Grand Duke as Louis II. Shortly afterwards, in 1832, Prince Charles returned to Hesse, where he joined his father's army and became a general in the infantry.

Marriage

In December 1835 at Fischbach Castle in Silesia, Prince Charles was engaged to his cousin Princess Elisabeth of Prussia. The engagement was conceived by Charles' mother, who was however to die a few weeks later. Princess Elisabeth was a daughter of Prince Wilhelm of Prussia, general of cavalry and governor of the Federal Fortress at Mainz, and his spouse Princess Maria Anna of Hesse-Homburg. She was also a niece of King Frederick William III of Prussia and her sister was the future Queen Marie of Bavaria. The wedding was celebrated on 22 October 1836 in Berlin.

The couple moved into the Prinz-Carl-Palais at Wilhelminenstraße 34 in Darmstadt, a residence they had built in Neoclassical style by the architect Georg Moller from 1834 to 1836. The couple had four children, Prince Louis, Prince Heinrich, Princess Anne, and Prince William, but they were unhappy together, as Prince Charles preferred life in the military to spending time with his family.

Later life

From 1836 until his death in 1877, Prince Charles was colonel-in-chief of the 4. Infantry Regiment, later named "Prinz Carl" after him. In accordance with the Constitution of the Grand Duchy of Hesse, Prince Charles was a member of the First Chamber of the Landtag of the Grand Duchy of Hesse from 1834 until a reform of the electoral law in 1849. As a liberal, the prince was long an advocate of giving the Grand Duchy of Hesse a free constitution. At the March Revolution of 1848, Prince Charles' father, Grand Duke Louis II, was forced to abdicate and handed over the throne to his son, Prince Charles' older brother, who became Grand Duke Louis III. As a consequence of the reactionism, Prince Charles was again a member of the First Chamber from 1856 to 1877.

As Prince Charles' elder brother, Grand Duke Louis III, and his wife Princess Mathilde of Bavaria, did not have children, Prince Charles was his heir presumptive. However, Prince Charles never became Grand Duke, partly because he died before his brother, partly because his eldest son, Prince Louis, had already been appointed successor to the throne. In 1862 the son concluded a brilliant marriage, as he married Princess Alice of the United Kingdom, second daughter of Queen Victoria of the United Kingdom and Prince Albert of Saxe-Coburg and Gotha. Two years later, his daughter Anna, who had been a confident of her cousin, the young King Ludwig II of Bavaria, married Frederick Francis II, Grand Duke of Mecklenburg-Schwerin. She died the following year, however, at the age of just 22 years.

Death and burial

On 19 March 1877, Queen Victoria received a telegram from her daughter Alice, wife of Charles' son Louis, saying that they "feared the worst". The following evening, news reached the Queen from Alice that Charles had "passed away quite peacefully after 6." The Queen appears to have been affected by Charles' death, referring to him in her journal upon his death as "dear excellent Prince Charles of Hesse", later repeating, "So grieved and feel deeply for poor Prince Charles." From 25 March, The Court went into mourning until 5 April. Prince Charles was buried at the Altes Mausoleum at Park Rosenhöhe in Darmstadt, one of the burial sites of the House of Hesse-Darmstadt.

Charles's eldest son, Louis, would become Grand Duke of Hesse and by the Rhine upon the death of Charles's childless brother, Louis III, three months later in 1877.

Issue
 Louis IV, Grand Duke of Hesse (12 September 1837 - 13 March 1892); Grand Duke of Hesse and by Rhine (13 June 1877 – 13 March 1892); married, firstly, Princess Alice of the United Kingdom and had issue. Married, secondly, Alexandrina Hutten-Czapska; annulled.
 Prince Heinrich of Hesse and by Rhine (1838-1900); married, firstly, Baroness Caroline of Nidda and had issue. Married, secondly, Baroness Emilie of Dornberg and had issue.
 Princess Anna of Hesse and by the Rhine (1843-1865); married Friedrich Franz II, Grand Duke of Mecklenburg-Schwerin and had issue.
 Prince Wilhelm of Hesse and by Rhine (1845 - 1900); married Baroness Josephine of Lichtenberg and had issue.

Ancestry

References

 Royal Family at Binternet
 Royal Genealogies Part 10

1809 births
1877 deaths
House of Hesse-Darmstadt
Nobility from Darmstadt
Members of the First Chamber of the Estates of the Grand Duchy of Hesse
Military personnel from Darmstadt
Burials at the Mausoleum for the Grand Ducal House of Hesse, Rosenhöhe (Darmstadt)
Sons of monarchs
Non-inheriting heirs presumptive